The A5038 is a road in Liverpool, England. It runs between the A562 Parliament Street and the A5036 Church Road/Dunnings Bridge Road.

Route
It starts on the A562 Parliament Street, and passes Liverpool Lime Street railway station as Lime Street and the carries on to end as Netherton Way in Netherton with a junction with the A5036 road.

References

Roads in England
Transport in Liverpool